LIR or Lir may refer to:
 Ler (mythology), sea god in Irish mythology, also known as Lir
 Liberia, UNDP country code LIR
 Lir (band)
 Lir, Chaharmahal and Bakhtiari, a village in Chaharmahal and Bakhtiari Province, Iran
 Lir Abi (disambiguation), villages in Chaharmahal and Bakhtiari Province, Iran
 Lir-e Shamlek, a village in Chaharmahal and Bakhtiari Province, Iran
 Lir, Masal, a village in Gilan Province, Iran
 Lir, Talesh, a village in Gilan Province, Iran
 Lir, Hormozgan, a village in Hormozgan Province, Iran
 Lir-e Bozorg, a village in Kohgiluyeh and Boyer-Ahmad Province, Iran
 Lir-e Kuchek, a village in Kohgiluyeh and Boyer-Ahmad Province, Iran
 Lir Tahrak, a village in Kohgiluyeh and Boyer-Ahmad Province, Iran
 Lir, Markazi, a village in Markazi Province, Iran
 Local Internet registry
 IATA airport code for Daniel Oduber Quirós International Airport in Costa Rica